Nicole Henry Fine Art is a West Palm Beach gallery specializing in emerging art markets including Cuban and Street Art to secondary works from Pre-Columbian, Old Masters, Impressionists, Modern, Contemporary, Latin American, European, and American Art. The Gallery was founded by art dealer Nicole Henry in 2006.

Biography of founder
After graduating from Southern Methodist University in Dallas, TX with a BFA in Art History and Studio Art, Nicole Henry was granted a treasury license from the U.S. government in 2001 to travel to Cuba and bring back Cuban Art. After amassing a large Cuban Collection, Henry opened her first Art Gallery in 2006 in Palm Beach Gardens, FL. In 2011, she moved her gallery to West Palm Beach where she still operates today.

Exhibitions & Group Shows
 2006: Nina Surel, Edouard Duval Carrie, Ismael Gomez-Peralta Group Show 
 2007: Exhibited in Art Miami 
 2007: Group show, Nantucket, MA important American Painters 
 2008: Contemporary Cuban Artists 
 2008: Latin American Masters
 2009: Group Show Contemporary and Latin American 
 2009: PGA Tour Wives Show 
 2009: Group Show Nina Surel and Carlos Jorge 
 2010: Group Show Contemporary and Modern Paintings
 2010: PGA Tour Wives Show 
 2010: Nina Surel and Edouard Duval Carrie 
 2011: PGA Tour Wives Show 
 2011: Cuban and Contemporary painters 
 2012: Contemporary Art Group Show
 2012: PGA Tour Wives Show Romero Britto 
 2013: Solo show for Max Zorn 
 2013: Jacob Felländer Solo show
 2014: Contemporary Art Group Show
 2015: Cuban and Contemporary Art Group Show 
 2015: Group Show for CANVAS Outdoor Museum Show Artists 
 2015: 1 Hotels South Beach Rooftop Mural Installation by Zeus and works by Jeremy Penn and Registered Artist, Art Basel Miami Beach
 2016: Bruce Helander Solo Show 
 2016: The Hula (Sean Yoro) Solo Show

See also
 West Palm Beach
 Palm Beach County
 Florida
 South Florida

References

Art museums and galleries in Florida
West Palm Beach, Florida
Companies based in Palm Beach County, Florida